Inorganic Crystal Structure Database (ICSD) is a chemical database founded in 1978 by Günter Bergerhoff (University of Bonn) and I. D. Brown (University of McMaster, Canada). It is now produced by FIZ Karlsruhe in Europe and the U.S. National Institute of Standards and Technology. It seeks to contain information on all inorganic crystal structures published since 1913, including pure elements, minerals, metals, and intermetallic compounds (with atomic coordinates). ICSD contains over 210,000 entries  and is updated twice a year.

A Windows-based PC version has been developed in co-operation with the National Institute of Standards and Technology (NIST), and a PHP-MySQL web based version in co-operation with the Institut Laue–Langevin (ILL) Grenoble.

See also 

Crystallographic database

References

External links
 ICSD Fiz
ICSD NIST

Inorganic chemistry
Chemical databases
Crystallographic databases